is a Japanese actress, singer, and tarento. She is a former member of Berryz Kobo, a J-pop idol group within Hello! Project.

Career
Sudo was born in Tokyo. In 2002, she successfully passed the Hello! Project Kids audition. Sudo was a member of the group Berryz Kobo from 2004 to 2015. In March 2009, she released her first Photobook, called "Maasa". In 2010, it was confirmed that she was going to be the lead-actress of the movie Light Novel no Tanoshii Kakikata!, based on a light novel with the same name, together with former Hello Pro Egg Arisa Noto, Hisanori Sato and others. The movie premiered in cinemas in Japan in December 2010, and the DVD was released March 3, 2011. Maasa played the role of "Tsurugi Yabusame".

Hello! Project groups and units
 Hello! Project Kids
 ZYX (2003−2015)
 Berryz Kobo (2004–2015)
 H.P. All Stars (2004)
 Hello! Project Mobekimasu (2011)

Discography

Filmography

Film

Television

Radio
 Berryz Kobo Beritsuu! (April 10, 2009 – current) (Co-host: Captain and Tokunaga Chinami)

References

External links
  

1992 births
Living people
Actresses from Tokyo
Japanese idols
Japanese women pop singers

Japanese child singers
Singers from Tokyo
21st-century Japanese singers
21st-century Japanese actresses
Berryz Kobo members
Hello! Project Kids members
21st-century Japanese women singers